Peter Foster is Public Policy Editor for The Financial Times. He was formerly the Europe Editor for The Daily Telegraph and The Sunday Telegraph newspapers. Prior to that he was the U.S. Editor from 2012–2015, Beijing correspondent for both newspapers 2009–2012, and the Indian Subcontinent correspondent from 2004 to 2008.

References

Living people
Year of birth missing (living people)
British male journalists